Sir John Southwood Jennings  (born 30 March 1937) is a British geologist who was Chancellor of Loughborough University, having previously been chairman of Shell Transport and Trading from 1993 to 1997, and a director until 2001.

He was born in Oldbury, Worcestershire, the son of George Southwood Jennings and Irene Beatrice Bartlett. He was educated at Oldbury Grammar School and Birmingham University. Sir John is Sloan Fellow of the London Business School and has honorary doctorates from Birmingham and Edinburgh Universities, having previously gained a BSc in Geology in 1958 and a PhD three years later. He joined Shell in 1968 and advanced through the ranks to become Managing Director of the Royal Dutch Shell Group from 1987 to 1997 and Chairman of the Shell Transport and Trading Company plc from 1993 to 1997, when he was knighted. Sir John was a Director of the company between 1987 and 2001.

Sir John succeeded Sir Denis Rooke to become Loughborough University's fourth Chancellor in 2003, he retired from this position in July 2010

References

British businesspeople
Businesspeople awarded knighthoods
Fellows of the Geological Society of London
Fellows of the Royal Society of Edinburgh
Commanders of the Order of the British Empire
Chancellors of Loughborough University
Knights Bachelor
1937 births
London Business School Sloan Fellows
Alumni of London Business School
Alumni of the University of Birmingham
Alumni of the University of Edinburgh
Living people
People named in the Panama Papers